(DOA) is a media franchise based on a fighting video game series developed by Team Ninja and published by Tecmo (Koei Tecmo). It is primarily composed of fast-paced fighting games that began with the original Dead or Alive in 1996. The series received critical and universal acclaim with the sequels Dead or Alive 2 in 1999 and Dead or Alive 3 in 2001, which are considered landmark titles. Dead or Alive is the creation of Tomonobu Itagaki, who has since left the company and is no longer working on the series, which continues without him.

The series revolves around the events of the Dead or Alive World Combat Championship, an international martial arts tournament where fighters from across the globe participate in for the title of world champion and large cash prizes. The tournaments are held by the Dead or Alive Tournament Executive Committee (DOATEC). The conflict between the ninja competitors and DOATEC's personnel serves as the main focus of the series.

Dead or Alive has been well praised for its impressive fighting system, beautiful graphics, and interactive environments. The franchise consists of six main fighting games, numerous updates and spin-offs. In addition to its fast-paced combat, beautiful environments and countering-based play system, the franchise is also known for its female characters. This aspect of the series' popularity led to the creation of the spin-off game Dead or Alive Xtreme Beach Volleyball and its sequels, where the female characters and their sex appeal play a more focal role than it does in the core Dead or Alive series. A film adaptation, DOA: Dead or Alive, was released in 2006. As of 2016, the franchise has sold over 9.7 million units worldwide.

Gameplay

The Dead or Alive series focuses on fast-paced gameplay in a three-dimensional playing field. Like other modern fighting games that attempt to emulate real life martial arts, DOA'''s input system is designed so controls correspond to the game character's actions; if the character moves forward with a punch, the controls most likely would include the punch input and pressing forward on the directional pad. In comparison to others in the fighting game genre, such as Virtua Fighter, the series places emphasis on striking characters quickly and efficiently. There is an emphasis on quick combos and air-juggles since the game's countering system and fast recovery times prevent slow, technical sets of moves in most instances.

The series uses interactive features that appear in certain fighting arenas, called "Danger Zones". Fighters caught in a Danger Zone will take extra damage, giving the attacker a slight advantage. These environmental hazards can be anything from Falls to Explosives to Breakable Structures. If a fighter has low health, being trapped in a Danger Zone is more likely to knock them out than a normal attack, although in certain titles, elements such as falls cannot do this, and instead just leave the fighter with very low health.

One of the series' most innovative additions to the genre is its countering system, officially known as the "Triangle System". The basic gameplay of the series is based on the Triangle System with three basic actions: Blows, Throws, and Holds; Blows beat Throws, Throws beat Holds, and Holds beat Blows. Beginning with the original Dead or Alive, players could tap the guard button and a direction corresponding with the anticipated attack, which would do a powerful counterattack known as Counter Hold. Counter Holds must be timed correctly and match the direction of the attack being countered. If the attack targets the torso, the player must also take into account whether the attack is a punch or a kick. The series controls also make the instances of speed and simplicity more congruent with the focus of timing and combos in mind, as the commands for basic attacks are widely considered more straightforward than most video games. There is only one button for punch, kick, throw and guard, with the player rarely having to combine more than two different input schemes together at a time.

In the first Dead or Alive, stages were simply fighting ring arenas and the Danger Zones were just explosive outer edges of the arena floors. In Dead or Alive 2, stage environments became larger and multi-tiered and the original Danger Zone was replaced with more fully interactive ones such as Falls off the Edge, Walls, Electrically Charged Walls, Explosive Walls, Breakable Walls and Windows. Players are also offered the ability to sidestep into the foreground or background.

Since Dead or Alive 2, the series has implemented its Tag team fighting system, allowing characters to switch back and forth for combo attacks and even attack simultaneously when timed correctly. The Tag Mode also included special throws unique to certain pairs of characters called "Tag Throws", and the mode allows for the participation of four players, something not very common in the fighting game genre. Dead or Alive 3 introduced the "Attack Change" feature in the Tag mechanics where the fighting character can switch places with a partner, in which the character jumping in can then unleash an attack while jumping in. Since Dead or Alive 3, Tag matches can be selected in the other game modes.Dead or Alive 3 improved upon the gameplay and graphics in superior detail compared to the previous games. The game offered unrestricted 3D-axis movements with better sidestepping, giving players the ability to dodge most attacks with a sidestep. The game added a new feature in its Sparring Mode called "Exercise" also known as "Command Training", an automatic command tutorial that teaches players how to perform attacks. The game expanded on the concept of multi-tiered environments, pushing the stage sizes larger than that of its predecessors.Dead or Alive 4 introduced the "Bounce Combo" system where players can perform further attacks to opponents who are bouncing off the floor or ground, and can also performed attacks on opponents while they are down. Moving Obstacles were introduced in certain stages as a type of Danger Zone that causes damage to fighters who are hit by them and using a counter hold at the right timing can help players avoid being hit by them. Jumping over non-moving Obstacles and performing flying attacks while jumping over them was also introduced. Dead or Alive: Dimensions utilizes the Nintendo 3DS bottom touchscreen in addition to the normal control system, offering optional touchscreen-based controls by tapping a move set to execute Blow combos, Throws, and Holds. Since Dimensions, the series supports in-game frame data that can be displayed during Training Mode.Dead or Alive 5 uses a revamped control system and features a more cinematic experience, especially with regards to Danger Zone effects. "Power Blow" is a triggered powerful attack that can enable the player that is low on health to knock the opponent character away in a selected direction, possibly initiating a cinematic quick time event called Cliffhanger. The game's new Critical System features Critical Stuns, Critical Combos, and Critical Bursts. Dead or Alive 5 Ultimate further added the vertical Power Launcher and an extensive Tutorial mode. Dead or Alive 5 Plus for the PlayStation Vita features optional touchscreen-based controls from first-person perspective.Dead or Alive 6 introduces both the Gauge System and costume customization. The Gauge System consists of the "Break Gauge", which allows numerous special moves to be performed depending on how full the gauge is, such as Fatal Rushes, Side Attacks, Break Holds, and Break Blows. The game also features an enhanced Bounce Combo system that allows players to bound their opponent on the ground for a finisher, with different inputs depending on the character. 

The spin-off Xtreme series is mostly based around two-on-two  matches of beach volleyball and casino gambling. After the original Dead or Alive Xtreme Beach Volleyball, the available activities have expanded to include the likes of watercraft racing and beach photography, while emphasizing the series' breast physics.

Plot and characters

The Dead or Alive series depicts a collection of skilled martial artists in a worldwide competition named the "Dead or Alive World Combat Championship", or simply "the Dead or Alive tournament". DOATEC (Dead or Alive Tournament Executive Committee), a massive corporation with unknown motives, holds the fighting competition in arenas ranging from the North Pole to the Amazon rain forest. Dead or Alive, the first game in the series, introduced the initial characters and their reasons for entering the tournament. For example, Zack enters for profit, while Kasumi, a runaway female ninja of the Mugen Tenshin Ninja Clan and the series' main protagonist, enters the tournament to seek revenge against Raidou who crippled her brother Hayate. Kasumi wins the first DOA tournament and kills Raidou, however, due to her status as a runaway, the strict laws of ninja society prevent Kasumi from returning to her village, and she becomes a hunted fugitive.Dead or Alive 2 is set less than a year later, as Tengu escapes from his world and threatens the human world. Fame Douglas, the founder and CEO of DOATEC was assassinated shortly after the first tournament, causing DOATEC to fall under a new leadership. Kasumi was kidnapped by DOATEC and was used as a subject in DOATEC's bio-weapon experiment, Alpha. Kasumi's brother Hayate, previously injured by Raidou, is also kidnapped and was used as a subject in DOATEC's bio-weapon experiment, Epsilon. New fighters include Ein, Helena Douglas, Kasumi Alpha, Leon, and Tengu. Eventually, Ryu Hayabusa defeats Tengu and wins the second tournament.Dead or Alive 3, takes place after the defeat of Tengu. This game's plot concerns a secret goal of DOATEC's mad scientist Victor Donovan to produce the ultimate fighter, called the Omega Project. Through the Epsilon and Alpha stages, DOATEC captures and wipes the Mugen Tenshin's Hajin Mon ninja Genra's memory, turning him into a vicious super human called Omega; a third tournament is later held to test Omega's abilities. In the end, Kasumi's half-sister Ayane defeats her former master and wins the third tournament. The game introduces five more fighters, the first playable appearance of Hayate, and the brand new fighters Brad Wong, Christie, Hitomi, and Omega.Dead or Alive 4 again explores DOATEC's attempts to create a powerful clone of Kasumi with the Alpha Project. The various fighters discover the true nature of DOATEC and set out to stop it. Helena takes over DOATEC as its new president and CEO, determined to fight against the corruption within the organization and change DOATEC for the better. Helena wins the fourth tournament and decides to give the title to Zack. The game introduces four new fighters, Alpha-152, Eliot, Kokoro, and La Mariposa.

The fifth game, Dead or Alive 5, is set two years later. DOATEC is newly reformed with Helena still in control and Zack appearing to be an employee. Donovan forms a new organization called MIST to continue the Alpha Project. Jann Lee beats Hitomi in the last round of the fifth tournament, thus winning. However, Jann Lee still felt that there is one person whom Jann Lee wants to defeat in order for him to be a true winner, Rig, who at first has an amnesia, but presumably ruse, and calling Donovan, “dad”. Meanwhile, Kasumi, Ryu, and Ayane, with the help from Helena, fight to destroy the Alpha project and stop Donovan.

Continuing to Dead or Alive 6, DOATEC and Mugen Tenshin discover that MIST is after the fifth tournament qualifier participant Honoka, due to her having a similar power signature as Raidou, causing them to keep an eye on her in different ways. Even worse, by the time the sixth tournament begins, Rig is found out to be indeed amnesiac; he was unknowingly implanted with a hypnotic suggestion by MIST that will brainwash him to serve them under the alias “Victor Donovan Jr.”, causing Bass and Jann Lee to worry and become suspicious of Rig's current situation. For the final tournament match, Jann Lee is once again officially a winner, but he was unofficially defeated by a newcomer, Diego. Ayane and Honoka are soon kidnapped by MIST and coerced into unwillingly reviving Raidou, their biological father, as an undead cyber ninja demon. As her older-half-sister Honoka is still weakened, Ayane teams up with Kasumi and Hayate to kill the revived Raidou once and for all, leaving no trace of him behind. Helena, who arrived at one of MIST's hidden laboratory to secure the place, approaches a young scientist who act as Lisa's replacement and is responsible for Raidou’ resurrection, NiCO. Although NiCO attempts to revive Helena's mother, Maria, Helena rejects her plan, causing NiCO to escape from her.

 History 

The series was created by its original director and producer Tomonobu Itagaki after he became a programmer for Tecmo in 1992. During the mid 1990s, Tecmo was in financial trouble and was in need of a hit to boost sagging game sales. In this vein, Itagaki made a wager with Junji Nakarmura, the head of the company, assuring the president he would create a video game that would garner a fan base. Tomonobu Itagaki stated how he was dissatisfied with the way modern fighting games at the time were presented; he missed the old arcade-style of play and had another vision for the fighting game genre. Following the initial working titles of "Ninja Fighter" and "Poligon Fighter", he named the series "Dead or Alive" to demonstrate the company and series' fail or succeed status, and proceeded to form a division in the company named Team Ninja. Itagaki's inspiration for the series derived from the Virtua Fighter and Fatal Fury series in Japan and the Mortal Kombat series in America, with DOA's sexual appeal drawn from the former series, and the ability to knock opponents off landscapes from the latter. When asked how he wished the series would contribute to the fighting genre, Itagaki replied: "I want people to remember DOA as a game that was very aggressive and combative. As to [...] how it contributed to the fighting genre – I look at it as something similar to how sushi was released in this country and became mainstream. You know, like, some people like graphics, some people like animation, some like flashy character design and so forth. Through DOA, we want to reach out to those people and become somewhat of a mainstream game."

After Tecmo's classic (but at that time long dormant) Ninja Gaiden series was revived in 2004 by Itagaki and Team Ninja, they began linking it back with Dead or Alive, setting the franchises within the same universe with overlapping characters and events. As it was a complete reboot of the series and did not continue the canon of any previous Ninja Gaiden titles, the developers were free to do with the universe and its characters as it saw fit, and so the game was implemented into the DOA universe by being set up as a prequel to the first DOA. In addition, Ninja Gaiden protagonist Ryu Hayabusa, who had already been on the roster of every DOA fighting game since the beginning, plays a major role in that series' overarching storyline, which has been fleshed out during the development of the subsequent Ninja Gaiden titles. Having featured Ryu in most of Dead or Alive games during a development of Ninja Gaiden reboot, Team Ninja then included the character Ayane and Kasumi in most of Ninja Gaiden games. Conversely, several characters from DOA have roles in the rebooted Ninja Gaiden series, initially only appearing during story sequences but becoming fully playable characters in special modes in later games. Rachel and Momiji, characters originating from the Ninja Gaiden series, appear in updated versions of Dead or Alive 5.

Before his departure from Team Ninja, Itagaki stated in 2006 that he had a new DOA game planned, but in a 2008 interview he said about the series: "This is another area that my closest colleagues and I all agree that we were able to achieve the definitive fighting game with DOA4. So we're not looking to extend the series at this point." In a released statement on June 3, 2008, Itagaki announced his resignation from Tecmo (July 1, 2008) due to business troubles with then president of Tecmo, Yoshimi Yasuda. Itagaki stated that this would unfortunately lead to the end of production for the game and its series. However, Tecmo replied with the announcement that Team Ninja would not be dissolved upon Itagaki's departure, stating that both the Ninja Gaiden and Dead or Alive franchises would remain in production and that some projects were already underway. As of 2016, the series continues two decades in, making it one of the longest-running fighting game franchises to still receive new installments. Dead or Alive Paradise was the first DOA console game not developed by Team Ninja. Dead or Alive 5 was created in partnership with Sega AM2 of Virtua Fighter fame, featuring several guest characters from that series. 

Games
Main series

Updated versions

Compilations

Spin-offs

Cancelled

Film adaptation

A feature film titled DOA: Dead or Alive, directed by Corey Yuen and starring Holly Valance, Devon Aoki, Jaime Pressly, Sarah Carter, and Natassia Malthe, was released in the United States on June 15, 2007. In the film, four female fighters are invited to a  martial arts contest; they begin as rivals, but work together to uncover the secret that Donovan, the organizer of the tournament, is trying to hide. Not screened in advance for the press, the film received negative reviews and was a flop at the box office.

Reception and legacy

The Dead or Alive games have been mostly well received. The fighting series have received positive reviews, with Dead or Alive 2 having the highest ratings out of the numbered games, and Dead or Alive 5 having the lowest except its Plus version for the Vita. 

The gameplay of the series was well praised for being fast-paced, fluid, aggressive, brutal, and strategic. Its Triangle system was notable for being innovative and unique to the fighting genre, Dead or Alive 2 was notable for improving and popularizing the concept of multi-tiered environments. Dead or Alive 3 was notable for improving and expanding on what the previous games offered, it was notable for being one of the titles that were quintessential in helping build the Xbox brand, and was the first fighting game to receive an award from the National Academy of Video Game Trade Reviewers (NAVGTR).

WatchMojo included the franchise in their Top 10 Tournament Fighting Game Franchises, ranking it 8th. GameRevolution included it in their Top 10 Fighting Game Franchises of All Time. Link Cable Gaming.com ranked it 10th in their Top 10: Fighting Game Franchises. Gaming.net ranked it 7th in their 7 Best Fighting Game Franchises of All Time. Dunia Games ranked it 4th toughest fighting game in their 10 Toughest Fighting Game Franchises of All Time. Play Legit.net included it in their Best Fighting Game Franchises and Stuff.tv included it in 10 of the best fighting games ever. Several games in the series have been considered as some of the best fighting games of all time and some of the best video games of all time. 

By July 2013, the DOA'' series has shipped 8.6 million copies worldwide. As of July 2016, the series had sold 9.7 million copies worldwide.

References

External links

 
 Dead or Alive franchise at MobyGames

 
Fighting video games by series
Koei Tecmo franchises
Video games about ninja
Video games adapted into films
Video game franchises
Video game franchises introduced in 1996
Video games set in the 21st century
Muay Thai video games
Internet memes introduced in 2012
Video game memes